Nicolas Arcales (born 11 February 1915) was a Filipino wrestler. He competed in the men's freestyle middleweight at the 1956 Summer Olympics.

References

1915 births
Year of death missing
Filipino male sport wrestlers
Olympic wrestlers of the Philippines
Wrestlers at the 1956 Summer Olympics
Place of birth missing
Asian Games medalists in wrestling
Wrestlers at the 1954 Asian Games
Wrestlers at the 1958 Asian Games
Medalists at the 1954 Asian Games
Medalists at the 1958 Asian Games
Asian Games silver medalists for the Philippines
Asian Games bronze medalists for the Philippines